The Liberation Day of Ukraine, officially the Day of Liberation of Ukraine from Fascist Invaders is a holiday celebrated annually on October 28 in Ukraine. It commemorates the Liberation of Ukraine from Nazi Germany on 28 October 1944.

Background
The first settlements in Eastern Ukraine were liberated by the Red Army in December 1942. Major battles for the liberation of the Ukrainian SSR lasted from January 1943 to the autumn of 1944. At this time, half of Ukraine was in the hands of the Red Army. On August 23, 1943, the city of Kharkiv was liberated. On October 27, 1944, Uzhhorod was retaken from the Germans, and Soviet troops arrived at what would be the modern western border of Ukraine. On October 28, 1944, the last territory of current Ukraine (near Uzhhorod, then part of the Kingdom of Hungary) was cleared of German troops; this is annually celebrated in Ukraine (on 28 October) as the "anniversary of the liberation of Ukraine from the Nazis".

The holiday
2004 marked the first time the anniversary was celebrated since independence. A large military parade held on Maidan Nezalezhnosti with the participation of President of Ukraine Leonid Kuchma and Russian President Vladimir Putin. The Victory Banner was brought to Kyiv from Moscow to take part in the parade on Khreshchatyk. The idea of making the date a national holiday was expressed by the then Minister of Economy of Ukraine Sergey Tigipko on October 15, 2009. Five days later, President Viktor Yushchenko signed a decree establishing the holiday. A couple days later, planned celebrations took place in accordance with a parliamentary decree signed in January.

On Liberation Day, the country honors of veterans and war dead, often laying wreaths and flowers at memorials. There are often exhibitions and displays of military equipment and military parades of the Armed Forces of Ukraine. Military tattoos and local parades of Military bands take place through the main streets of local cities. Folk festivals and holiday concerts also take place.

Renaming proposal 
In 2019, the Ukrainian Institute of National Memory, then led by Volodymyr Viatrovych, proposed renaming the Liberation Day into the "Day of Expulsion of the Nazi occupiers", noting that after 28 October 1944 Ukraine did not become an independent nation, but returned under the control of the Soviet Union. However, such proposal was not adopted.

Gallery

See also 
 60th Anniversary of the Liberation of Ukraine
 Liberation Day (Moldova)
 Public holidays in Ukraine
 Second World War
 V-E Day 
 Victory Day over Nazism in World War II

References

External links

1944 in Ukraine
October observances
Observances in Ukraine
Victory days